Frank Barlow  (19 April 1911 – 27 June 2009) was an English historian, known particularly for biographies of medieval figures. His subjects included Edward the Confessor, Thomas Becket and William Rufus.

Academic life
Barlow studied at St John's College, Oxford.

He was Professor of History at the University of Exeter from 1953 until he retired in 1976 and became Emeritus Professor. He was a Fellow of both the British Academy and the Royal Society of Literature, and was appointed commander of the Order of the British Empire in the 1989 Queen's Birthday Honours "for services to the study of English medieval history".

Works
The Feudal Kingdom of England (1955)
The Life of King Edward Who Rests at Westminster (1962, 2nd edition 1992), editor and translator
Edward the Confessor (1970, 2nd edition 1997)
The English Church 1066–1154 (1979)
The Norman Conquest and Beyond (1983)
William Rufus (Berkeley, California, University of California Press, 1983)
Thomas Becket (1986)
The Carmen de Hastingae Proelio of Guy Bishop of Amiens (1999), editor and translator
The Godwins: The Rise and Fall of a Noble Dynasty (2002)
Writing Medieval Biography, 750–1250: Essays in Honour of Frank Barlow (2006), edited by David Bates, Julia Crick and Sarah Hamilton

References

External links

Who's who: Frank Barlow
Obituary, The Guardian, printed 24 July 2009
Obituary, The Daily Telegraph, printed 17 August 2009

1911 births
2009 deaths
20th-century English historians
Academics of the University of Exeter
Academics of University College London
Alumni of St John's College, Oxford
Anglo-Saxon studies scholars
British medievalists
Commanders of the Order of the British Empire
Fellows of the Royal Society of Literature
Fellows of the British Academy
Intelligence Corps officers
People from Wolstanton
People educated at Newcastle-under-Lyme School